Tim Anstee (born 19 May 1997 in Australia) is an Australian rugby union player who plays for the  in Super Rugby. His playing position is flanker. He was named in the Force squad for the 2021 Super Rugby AU season. He had previously represented the Australia Sevens team at 24 competitions between 2016 and 2020. Tim was nominated for Cosmopolitan Bachelor of the Year in 2017.

Reference list

External links
Rugby.com.au profile
itsrugby.co.uk profile

1997 births
Australian rugby union players
Living people
Rugby union flankers
Western Force players
Rugby union players from Sydney